Cormetasone, or cormethasone, is a synthetic glucocorticoid corticosteroid which was never marketed.

References

Diketones
Fluoroarenes
Glucocorticoids
Pregnanes
Triols
Abandoned drugs